Ballinascarthy GAA is a Gaelic Athletic Association club based in the village of Ballinascarthy, County Cork, Ireland. It is affiliated with Cork GAA and Carbery divisional board. The club participates in both Gaelic Football and Hurling competitions.

History
The Ballinascarthy club was formed in 1945. The current club caters for 20 teams of all age groups from under 6 years and upwards in both hurling and football.

The first material success came in 1956 when the junior (2) Footballers captured the South West Championship. This was a significant achievement at the time considering that the competition was then contested by all the Junior 1 teams eliminated in the first round of the premier championship including first string sides from major clubs such as Bantry Blues and Skibbereen.

Hurling was revived in the club in 1961, and three years later in 1964 the club captured their first hurling silverware when defeating Clonakilty in the first round, then Newcestown and went on to play Barryroe in the final of the West Cork Junior B Hurling Championship in poor weather conditions. The West Cork junior football trophy, ‘The Little Norah’, was finally captured in 1978 after many close defeats during 1959, 1960, 1968 and 1969. Having beaten Carbery Rangers in the final, the team went on to win a county quarter final game with Kilmurry and narrowly lost out to eventual county champions Kildorrery in the semi-final which was played in Páirc Uí Choimh. In 1983, a second title was secured when Gabriel Rangers were defeated in the final. Again, the team bowed-out at the semi-final stage to eventual county champions Donoughmore.

The junior A hurlers captured their first title in 1989 when landing the Flyer Nyhan trophy after defeating Newcestown in the final. As a bonus, the league trophy was added later that year following an inter-divisional county campaign which just eluded them after a replay defeat by Clyda Rovers in the final. Success in top grade junior hurling returned in 1997 when Ballinascarthy overcame favourites Bandon and back-to-back titles were secured twelve months later against the same opposition. In the millennium year, the feat was repeated after a replay win over Barryroe to make it three titles in four years. In each of these years, Ballinascarthy were defeated at the penultimate stage by the eventual Cork Junior Hurling Championship winners. 

The club has been successful at minor and U21 level over the years winning a hurling and football double in 1985. The club's first county title success was secured in 2004 when the minor hurlers brought home the Cork Minor B Hurling Championship.
The first county title at adult level was secured by the under 21 hurlers, capturing the Cork Under 21 B Hurling Championship in 2013.

Honours
 Cork Junior Hurling Championship (0): (Runner-up 1989)
 Cork Under-21 B Hurling Championship (1): 2013,
 Cork Under-21 B Football Championship (0): (Runners-up 2014)
 Cork Minor B Hurling Championship (1): 2004
 Cork Feile B Football Championship (1): 2014 
 South West Junior A Football Championship (2): 1978, 1983
 South West Junior A Hurling Championship (6): 1989, 1997, 1998, 2000, 2019, 2021
South West Cork Junior B Football Championship (1): 1966
 West Cork Junior D Football Championship (1): 2005
 West Cork Minor B Hurling Championship (4): 1991, 2004 (as Pedlars Cross), 1999, 2001
 West Cork Under-21 A Hurling Championship (1): 1982
 West Cork Under-21 B Hurling Championship (6): 1986, 1989, 1993, 1998, 2010, 2013
 West Cork Under-21 B Football Championship (2): 1986, 2014

Notable players
 Teddy Holland 
 Fachtna Murphy

References

External links
Official Ballinascarthy Club website

Hurling clubs in County Cork
Gaelic football clubs in County Cork
Gaelic games clubs in County Cork